San Nicolás de Bari, also named San Nicolás, is a municipality and town in the Mayabeque Province of Cuba. It was founded in 1846.

Geography
The municipality is divided into the barrios of Hector Molina, Babiney Prieto, Barbudo, Caimito, Gabriel, Jobo, Pueblo y Paradero and Zaldívar.

Demographics
In 2004, the municipality of San Nicolás had a population of 21,563.

Celebrities: Yoandry Alonso

See also
San Nicolás de Bari Airport
San Nicolás de Bari Municipal Museum
Municipalities of Cuba
List of cities in Cuba

References

External links

Populated places in Mayabeque Province